Alexandrovka is a rural locality (a village) in Muromsky District, Vladimir Oblast, Russia. The population was 607 as of 2010. There are 4 streets.

Geography 
Alexandrovka is located 6 km west of Murom. Murom is the nearest rural locality.

References 

Rural localities in Muromsky District